Signal One (also known as Bullet Down Under) is a 1994 Australian crime film directed by Rob Stewart and starring Christopher Atkins, Mark Jackson, Richard Carter, and Virginia Hey. It is a buddy cop movie.

Production
The film was known as Bullet Down Under.

It was made partly with finance from the NSW Film and Television Office and the FFC.

Plot synopsis
Martin Bullet is a former cop from Los Angeles who has just moved to Sydney, Australia to escape difficulties back home. Joining the Sydney police force, Martin is given Jack Moran for a partner after the latter lost one recently. The two become involved in the unsavory dealings of a vicious crime syndicate while trying to solve the murder of Jack's last partner.

Cast
Christopher Atkins as Martin Bullet
Mark 'Jacko' Jackson as Jack Moran
Richard Carter as Frankie Button
Virginia Hey as Toni
Alfred Bell as Doug Button
Maureen O'Shaughnessy as Charlene Bullet
Laurie Moran as Boza Hentley
Kee Chan as Chang Kai Chee

References

External links

1990s English-language films
1994 thriller films
Australian thriller films
1994 films
1990s Australian films